is a rhetorical concept in Japanese poetry.

Definition

 is a category of poetic words, often involving place names, that allow for greater allusions and intertextuality across Japanese poems.

 enables poets to express ideas and themes concisely—thus allowing them to stay in the confines of strict  structures.
 
Some scholars see the use of geographical allusion as the evidence for a restricted scope of poetry writing. Although the poets' "true" meaning was true because the essence was initially pre-established, the poems were written within fixed topics. The poet could inhabit a subjective position or persona and write about the topic, but not necessarily about their personal feelings; therefore,  could have restrained the scope of topics a poet could write about.

 include locations familiar to the court of ancient Japan, such as:
 particularly sacred Shinto and Buddhist sites,
 places where historic events occurred, and
 places that trigger a separate mental association through a pun.

Aesthetic function

 serve as a significant tool to achieve  (mystery and depth) in Japanese poetry by adding profound and indirect beauty in poems. It can be used as a source for identifying significant figures and places in ancient Japan.

History

 were first used by traveling priests. They collected stories from the towns they traveled to. Since they saw many places, it was easier to remember the details of a story by using a single, consistent reference point for each recurring event in their tales. Over time, the people across the Japan came to identify  place names by the psychological feelings associated with the references made by the wandering priests.

Beyond becoming familiar with the scenery of the poems, entering the locale of a poem or story deepened one's understanding of it.

Examples

The source of this particular  example is poem #3 in the "Spring" section.

In the poem above, Yoshino refers to a place in the Yamato region in the nearby of the capital. Yoshino is known for having both heavy snowfall and an abundance of cherry blossoms.

Poem #1 in "Spring 1" of Shin Kokin Wakashū also uses Yoshino for depicting the beginning of spring.

Another instance of poetic place name comes from Tales of Ise, a piece titled "In the Provinces" (#15).

Mount Shinobu is a pun on the verb shinobu, meaning "to conceal," "endure," "long for," and "remember."

Contemporary examples

In Japan there are many examples of utamakura in everyday readings. Often, menu items will be named after their visual appearance with a reference to a well-known Japanese scenic area.

For example, the Tatsuta River is famous for its red autumn maples. Therefore, a menu that includes tatsuta age will have crispy fish or chicken that was marinated in soy sauce before it was dredged in cornstarch and deep fried. The cornstarch coating absorbs some of the soy, so that when it is fried it takes on a burnished, russet color.

See also

Notes

References
 Kamens, Edward. Utamakura, Allusion, and Intertextuality in Traditional Japanese Poetry. Yale University Press, 1997. 
Raud, Rein. “The Lover’s Subject: Its Construction and Relativization in the Waka Poetry of the Heian Period”. In Proceedings of the Midwest Association for Japanese Literary Studies, vol. 5, summer 1999, pp. 65–79.
Shirane, Haruo (editor). Traditional Japanese Literature. Columbia University Press: New York, 2007.
Wright, Ichabod C (Translator). The Inferno of Dante. Longman, Rees, Orme, Brown, Green and Longman: London, 1833.

Japanese aesthetics
Japanese poetry
Articles containing Japanese poems
Japanese words and phrases
Allegory